Books on Tape (sometimes abbreviated BoT) is an audiobook publishing imprint of Random House which emphasizes unabridged audiobook recordings for schools and libraries.  It was previously an independent California-based company before its acquisition by Random House, in 2001.

The company was founded by Olympic gold medalist Duvall Hecht in 1975 as a direct to consumer mail order rental service for unabridged audiobooks on cassette tape. It was one of the pioneering companies in the fledgling audiobook business along with Recorded Books.

See also
David Frederick Case
Grover Gardner

References

External links
 
 
 

1975 establishments in California
Audiobook companies and organizations
Random House